Fuladlui-ye Shomali Rural District is in Hir District of Ardabil County, Ardabil province, Iran. At the census of 2006, its population was 9,263 in 1,924 households; there were 9,423 inhabitants in 2,492 households at the following census of 2011; and in the most recent census of 2016, it had decreased to 9,341 in 2,632 households. The largest of its 12 villages was Aralluy-e Bozorg, with 2,650 people.

References 

Ardabil County

Rural Districts of Ardabil Province

Populated places in Ardabil Province

Populated places in Ardabil County